The 81st Oregon Legislative Assembly was the legislative session of the Oregon Legislative Assembly that convened on January 11, 2021 and adjourned June 26th.  Its even-year short session of 35 days convened on February 1, 2022 and adjourned sine die on March 4, 2022.

The Democratic Party of Oregon retained supermajority status in both chambers: as a result of the 2020 Oregon State Senate election, the Democrats kept its 18–12 majority, and in the 2020 Oregon House of Representatives election, the party's majority slipped by a single seat to maintain a 37–23 majority.

Legislation 
During the 35 day short session that began February 1, 2022, lawmakers considered more than 250 bills and allocating between $1.5 and $2 billion in funding.

Successful 

SCR 203 "Adjourns sine die 2022 regular session of Eighty-first Legislative Assembly."

SCR 204 "Establishes deadlines for presession-filed legislative measures for 2023 regular session of Eighty-second Legislative Assembly."

5703A SB 5703A "Modifies amounts allocated from Administrative Services Economic Development Fund to state agencies."

SB 5702A "Establishes and modifies limits on payment of expenses from specified funds by certain state agencies for capital construction."

SB 5701 "Modifies projects and amounts authorized for issuance of general obligation bonds, revenue bonds, certificates of participation and other financing agreements for biennium."

HB 1584 "Creates procedure for filing petition for compensation for wrongful conviction."

HB 1567B(50-7) "Requires owners or operators of bulk oils and liquid fuels terminals located in Columbia, Multnomah or Lane County to conduct and submit to Department of Environmental Quality seismic vulnerability assessments."

HB 1560 "Updates statutory references to individual who is not citizen or national of United States to replace 'alien' with 'noncitizen.' Directs state agencies to use 'noncitizen' in rules and regulations to reference individual who is not citizen or national of United States and to update rules and regulations that use 'alien' to use 'noncitizen.' Authorizes agencies to amend rule without prior notice or hearing for purpose of changing term or phrase in order to conform with change made by law."

HB 1556B "Requires Department of Human Services to establish certification process for direct care providers of home or community-based services and implement online registry of direct care providers of home or community-based services."

HB 1547 "Requires operators, employees and certain volunteers of preschool recorded programs and school-age recorded programs to be enrolled in Central Background Registry."

HB 4156 "Provides that Broadband Fund may include moneys appropriated or transferred to fund."

SB 1536 "Limits restrictions on portable cooling devices in residences by landlords, homeowners associations, condominium associations and local governments."

SB 1520 "Requires certain distributors that do not participate in distributor cooperative to provide services for processing and paying refund value for beverage containers."

SB 1504 "Provides that Multi-Jurisdictional Simulcasting and Interactive Wagering Totalizator Hub licensee may establish account for wagering on greyhound racing for individual unless wagering on live greyhound racing is unlawful in jurisdiction of individual's principal residence."

SB 1501 "Directs State Board of Forestry to adopt single rule package on or before November 30, 2022, to implement Private Forest Accord Report."

SB 1510 (34-24, 3/3/2022) "Requires police officer to inform stopped person of right to refuse consent to search."

SB 1545 "Establishes grant programs in Higher Education Coordinating Commission to provide funding for workforce development activities that aim to increase access for priority populations to training opportunities in technology, health care and manufacturing and to workforce development services and benefits."

SB 1538 "Establishes COFA Dental Program in Oregon Health Authority to provide dental care to low-income citizens of Pacific Islands in Compact of Free Association who reside in Oregon."

SB 1522 "Authorizes high school teachers who are employed by education service districts to serve as members of Transfer Council."

SB 1519 "Grants property tax exemption for proportion of community solar project that is owned by residential customers or leased by residential subscribers."

SB 1579 (40-19, 3/3/2022) "Directs Oregon Business Development Department to develop and implement Economic Equity Investment Program to award grants to organizations that provide culturally responsive services to support economic stability, self-sufficiency, wealth building and economic equity among disadvantaged individuals, families, businesses and communities in Oregon."

— Bill descriptions are taken from OregonLegislature.gov — Current Session Bills

Sent to referendum

Unsuccessful

Senate 

The Oregon State Senate is composed of 18 Democrats, 11 Republicans, and one Independent.

Senate President: Peter Courtney (D–11 Salem)
President Pro Tempore: James Manning Jr. (D–7 Eugene)
Majority Leader: Rob Wagner (D-19 Lake Oswego)
Minority Leader: Fred Girod (R-9 Stayton) until October 22, 2021; Tim Knopp (R-27 Bend)

Events 

In January 2021, Senator Alan Olsen abruptly announced his resignation from office. He told his colleagues it was a “very difficult decision to make,” but his “family always comes first". The Clackamas and Marion County commissioners appointed former Clackamas County Commissioner and Oregon State Representative Bill Kennemer to succeed Sen. Olsen.

In October 2021, Senator Fred Girod (R) announced that we was immediately resigning his position as the Senate minority leader due to unspecified health concerns. Senator Tim Knopp (R) replaced him in this role as of October 22, 2021.

In November 2021, Senator Ginny Burdick (D) was appointed by Governor Kate Brown to the Pacific Northwest Electric Power and Conservation Planning Council. The Washington County commissioners appointed former Representative Akasha Lawrence-Spence to serve the remaining term of Sen. Burdick.

In December 2021, Senator Betsy Johnson resigned from her seat to focus all her attention on her independent run for governor and ensure her constituents had someone fully dedicated to representing them. In her resignation, Senator Johnson requested that the county commissioners appoint a someone who would not run again for the seat. The commissioners from Clatsop, Columbia, Multnomah, Tillamook, Washington, and Yamhill counties appointed Rachel Armitage.

House

Based on the results of the 2020 elections, the Oregon House of Representatives is composed of 37 Democrats and 23 Republicans. Republicans gained one seat from the previous session.

Speaker: Tina Kotek (D–44 Portland) until January 21, 2022; Dan Rayfield (D-16 Corvallis)

Representative Paul Holvey served as acting Speaker of the House from January 21, 2022 to February 1, 2022.

Speaker Pro Tempore: Paul Holvey (D-8 Eugene)
Majority Leader: Barbara Smith Warner (D-45 Portland) until January 16, 2022; Julie Fahey (D-14 Eugene)
Minority Leader: Christine Drazan (R-39 Canby) until November 30, 2021; Vikki Breese-Iverson (R-55 Prineville)

See also
 2020 Oregon State Senate election
 2020 Oregon House of Representatives election

Notes

References

External links 
 Oregonlive.gov—Measures introduced into the Oregon Legislature IN THE 2022 SESSION
 Chronology of regular legislative sessions from the Oregon Blue Book
 Chronology of special legislative sessions from the Blue Book

2021 in Oregon
2022 in Oregon
Oregon
Oregon
Oregon legislative sessions
Oregon Legislative Assembly